UNIZO is a Belgian association of entrepreneurs, Small and Medium Sized Enterprises (SME); it is mainly situated in the Flemish region of the Kingdom of Belgium. 

The Union of Independent Entrepreneurs (UNIZO) is a Belgian association of entrepreneurs, small and medium-sized enterprises and liberal professions. With over 80,000 members, it is the largest association of its kind and is mainly located in the Flemish Region. The association is represented in the National Labour Council and in the Social and Economic Council of Flanders. Danny Van Assche has been the managing director since 2 January 2018.

Publication
UNIZO publishes the magazine, z.o. magazine. The magazine is intended for small and medium-sized enterprises. Sold commercially in Belgium, it has a run of 86,844 copies. It is the largest review in Belgium for this target group.

See also
 Agoria
 Brussels Enterprises Commerce and Industry (BECI)
 Economy of Belgium
 European Association of Craft, Small and Medium-Sized Enterprises (UEAPME)
 Federation of Belgian Enterprises
 VKW
 National Federation of Independent Business (USA)
 VOKA
 Walloon Union of Companies

External links
 UNIZO
 Union of Self-Employed Entrepreneurs in ODIS - Online Database for Intermediary Structures 
 Archives of Union of Self-Employed Entrepreneurs in ODIS - Online Database for Intermediary Structures 

Christian organisations based in Belgium
UNIZO